Thomas Mann Gymnasium may refer to:
Thomas Mann Gymnasium (Munich) (DE)
Thomas Mann Gymnasium Stutensee (DE)
Thomas Mann Gymnasium (Budapest)